Philip Carlo Barbon Greatwich (born 21 January 1987) is an English-born Philippine international footballer. He qualifies for that country because his mother Carolina is Filipina. He plays as a full back.

Greatwich was born in Brighton, and began his football career as a schoolboy with Brighton & Hove Albion. Released as a 16-year-old, he made his debut in first-team football for Burgess Hill Town of the Isthmian League Division One South, and won the club's Young Player of the Year award for the 2005–06 season. Greatwich received his first call-up to the senior Philippine national team in October 2006, and played in all three of the Philippines' group matches in the 2007 ASEAN Football Championship finals.

In 2007, he went to the United States to begin a course in Sports Management at Towson University, Maryland, where he played for the Towson Tigers soccer team.

Greatwich's older brother Chris and younger brother Simon are also Philippines international footballers.

References

External links
 
 Profile at Towson University Athletics website

1987 births
Living people
Footballers from Brighton
English footballers
Filipino footballers
Filipino expatriate footballers
Philippines international footballers
Association football defenders
Filipino British sportspeople
British Asian footballers
Brighton & Hove Albion F.C. players
Burgess Hill Town F.C. players
Towson Tigers men's soccer players
Baltimore Bohemians players
USL League Two players